Mehmet Nâzım Bey (1886; Kayseri - July 15, 1921; Yumruçal) was an officer of the Ottoman Army and the Turkish Army.

He was killed in action by the Greek Army on July 15, 1921 during the Battle of Yumruçal (see Battle of Afyonkarahisar–Eskişehir).

See also
List of high-ranking commanders of the Turkish War of Independence
Battle of Afyonkarahisar–Eskişehir

Sources

External links

1886 births
1921 deaths
People from Kayseri
Ottoman Military Academy alumni
Ottoman Military College alumni
Ottoman Army officers
Ottoman military personnel of the Italo-Turkish War
Ottoman military personnel of the Balkan Wars
Ottoman military personnel of World War I
Turkish Army officers
Turkish military personnel of the Greco-Turkish War (1919–1922)
Recipients of the Medal of Independence with Red Ribbon (Turkey)
Turkish military personnel killed in action
Burials at Turkish State Cemetery